Devil's Garden or Devils Garden may refer to:

Places
 Devils Garden (Arches National Park), Utah, U.S.
 Devils Garden (Grand Staircase–Escalante National Monument), Utah, U.S.
 Devils Garden volcanic field, southeast of Newberry Caldera, Oregon, U.S.
 Devils Garden, a a place in Riverside County, California, U.S.

Artsand entertainment
The Devil’s Garden (Maxwell book), by W. B. Maxwell, 1913
 The Devil's Garden, a lost 1920 American silent drama film, based on Maxwell's book
The Devil's Garden (Docx novel), by Edward Docx, 2011
Devil's Garden, a 2009 novel by Ace Atkins

Other uses
Devil's garden, a stand of trees in the Amazon Rainforest of at most three tree species and the ant Myrmelachista schumanni
Devil's gardens, World War II defensive positions at El Alamein